Kannathil Muthamittal ( A Peck on The Cheek) is a 2022 Indian Tamil-language drama television series that airs on Zee Tamil and it is digitally available on ZEE5. It stars Padine Kumar, Rajeshwari and Santhosh in the lead roles. The series premiered on 11 April 2022 and is a remake of Zee TV television series Tujhse Hai Raabta. This is a tale of a bittersweet relationship between a stepmother and a daughter.

Synopsis
Subathra is married to Madhiazhagan. It has been 5 years since they are married. One day all of a sudden Madhiazhagan marries Vennila who loves Madhiazhagan even though Vennila knows that Madhiazhagan is already married. The marriage happened because Vennila got pregnant by Madhiazhagan. Madhiazhagan brings Vennila to his house after they got married secretly but nobody in Madhiazhagan’s family accepted them and they kicked out Madhiazhagan and Vennila out of the house. While Madhiazhagan’s mother Saradha is heartbroken after the incident, she decided to care for Subathra as like her own daughter.

18 years later 
Madhiazhagan and Vennila lives in the city and they daughter name Aadhira who is 18 years old and grown up. On the day of Madhiazhagan’s and Vennila’s wedding anniversary, Madhiazhagan got a phone call from Subathra and Vennila had a huge argument with Madhiazhagan because Vennila thinks Madhiazhagan is still in touch with Subathra and thinks there is something in between them. Then Vennila got angry and went near the balcony but falls down while holding Madhiazhagan’s hand because Madhiazhagan accidentally let go of Vennila. Vennila eventually dies and Madhiazhagan is jailed from this incident because at the court, Madhiazhagan got accused of pushing Vennila down the Vennila but in reality that’s not case. Aadhira is under the custody of Madhiazhagan’s first wife Subathra until Aadhira becomes a major.  Aadhira thinks Subathra is the reason why her mother Vennila died and Aadhira started to hate Subathra. Will Aadhira find the truth about Subathra and accepts her? That continues the rest of the story

Cast

Main
 Manishajith (2022) / Padine Kumar (2022–present) as Aadhira Madhiazhagan – Vennila and Madhiazhagan's daughter; Subathra's step-daughter; Thiru Maaran's cousin and wife
 Divya Padmini (2022) / Rajeshwari (2022–present) as Subathra – Madhiazhagan's first wife; Aadhira's step-mother 
 Santhosh as Thiru Maaran Saravanan – Saravanan and Agalya's son; Aadhira's cousin and husband; Charumathi's former husband

Supporting
 Manush as Madhiazhagan Rajadurai – Saradha and Rajadurai's elder son; Agalya and Thamilvanan's brother; Subathra's ex-husband; Vennila's widower; Aadhira's father
 Asharani Nagesh as Saradha Rajadurai – Rajadurai's wife; Madhiazhagan, Agalya and Thamilvanan's mother; Aadhira and Thiru Maaran's grandmother.
 Andrews Jesudoss as Rajadurai – Saradha's husband; Madhiazhagan, Agalya and Thamilvanan's father; Aadhira and Thiru Maaran's grandfather.
 Priyanka as Agalya Rajadurai Saravanan – Saradha and Rajadurai's daughter; Madhiazhagan and Thamilvanan's sister; Saravanan's wife; Thiru Maaran's mother
 Sarath Chanrda as Saravanan – Agalya's husband; Thiru Maaran's father; Vennila's elder brother
 Mounica Senthilkumar as Charumathi Thiru Maaran – Thiru Maaran's wife; Akilan's love interest
 Chaanakyaa (2022) / VJ Sam (2022–present) as Akilan – Charumathi's love interest 
 Dhanalakshmi Shiva as Sharanya - Thamilvanan wife; Akilan's elder sister
 Ammu Ramachandran as Vennila Madhiazhagan – Madhiazhagan's second wife; Aadhira's mother; Saravanan’s younger sister (Dead)

Adaptations

References

External links 
 
 Kannathil Muthamittal at ZEE5

Zee Tamil original programming
Tamil-language romance television series
Tamil-language police television series
2022 Tamil-language television series debuts
Tamil-language television soap operas
Television shows set in Tamil Nadu
Tamil-language television series based on Hindi-language television series
Tamil-language television shows